Brian Allen Carr (born 1979 in Austin, Texas) is an American writer.  He is the author of the short story collection Short Bus (2011) and was the winner of the inaugural Texas Observer Story Prize as judged by Larry McMurtry in 2011. Carr was also a finalist for the Texas Institute of Letters Steven Turner Award for First Fiction, 2011. His stories have appeared in Annalemma, Boulevard, Fiction International, Hobart, Keyhole and Texas Review, among others. He is still battling male pattern baldness aggressively. 
His book "Sip" has been greenlit for movie production for a future date.

Bibliography
Short Bus (2011, Texas Review Press)
Vampire Conditions (2012, Holler Presents)
Edie & the Low-Hung Hands (2013, Small Doggie Press)
Motherfucking Sharks (2013, Lazy Fascist Press)
The Last Horror Novel in the History of the World (2014, Lazy Fascist Press)
Sip (2017, Soho Press)
Opioid, Indiana (2019, Soho Press)

References

External links 
 Official site
 Short Bus site
 Holler Presents

1978 births
American male writers
Living people